Dru Hill is an American R&B group, whose repertoire included soul, hip hop soul and gospel music. The group was founded in Baltimore in 1992 and is still active. Dru Hill recorded seven Top 40 hits, and is best known for the R&B number-one hits "In My Bed", "Never Make a Promise" and "How Deep Is Your Love". Its original members were lead singer Mark "Sisqó" Andrews, Tamir "Nokio" Ruffin, Larry "Jazz" Anthony and James "Woody" Green. The group achieved popularity in the 1990s.

Signing to Island Records through Haqq Islam's University Records imprint, the group released two successful albums, Dru Hill and Enter the Dru, before separating for a period from late 1999 to 2002, during which time Sisqó and Woody released solo albums. Dru Hill was influenced by the Dragon and Asian culture, as displayed in their wardrobe and logo. While Woody's album Soul Music was a moderate success in the gospel music industry, Sisqó's debut album, Unleash the Dragon, and its hit singles, "Thong Song" and "Incomplete", were major pop successes, and established Sisqó as a household name outside of Dru Hill. Sisqó's second album, Return of Dragon, did not perform as well.

In 2002, by then part of the Def Soul record label, the group reunited and added fifth member Scola to the lineup for their third album, Dru World Order; after that album underperformed the group met with New Label President L.A. Reid about a follow-up. Due to the group's failure to produce any new music featuring Sisqo (he chose not to lend his vocals to new recordings), Def Jam cited the group as non-productive and destructive and dropped the group from Def Soul. In 2009, the group signed to Kedar Entertainment Group and released their fourth album, InDRUpendence Day, the following year, with new member Tao taking the place of the again departed Woody.

History

Early career
The members of Dru Hill are natives of Baltimore. The group became known getting jobs at The Fudgery, a local fudge factory at Harborplace at Baltimore's Inner Harbor, beginning a store tradition of singing and performing to entertain guests while making fudge. The group's name comes from Baltimore's Druid Hill Park, which is commonly shortened in the local vernacular to "Dru Hill".

Between their first and second albums, Dru Hill contributed "We're Not Making Love No More", a number 2 R&B and number 13 pop hit, to the Soul Food soundtrack. "We're Not Making Love No More" was written and produced by producer Babyface. Dru Hill and rapper Foxy Brown recorded "Big Bad Mama", a remake of Carl Carlton's 1981 hit "She's a Bad Mama Jama (She's Built, She's Stacked)", which was the main single for the soundtrack to the 1997 Bill Bellamy film Def Jam's How to Be a Player. The group was also instrumental in writing and producing for new University artist Mýa, whose first two singles "It's All About Me" and "Movin' On", were co-written by Sisqó, who also performs guest vocals on "It's All About Me".

In 1997, Dru Hill filed a lawsuit against Island Records, seeking a release from its contract, after an Island employee hit one of the group's managers, Keith Ingram, over the head with a pool cue. It was discovered that the employee in question had a criminal record. At an October 1997 deposition hearing, Eric Kronfeld, president and chief operating officer of Island's parent company PolyGram, was asked why he had hired such an individual. His response was that if he were not to hire African-Americans with criminal records, then "there would be virtually no African-Americans employees in our society or in our industry."

Kronfield's remarks set off a wave of controversy when word of them reached the media in November. The Reverend Jesse Jackson became personally involved, publicly stating that the Dutch-based PolyGram had "a pattern of race and sex exclusion." Jackson met with PolyGram chairman Alain Levy and several other executives, who issued a public apology for Kronfield's statement, and replaced Kronfield as president with Motown Records' chairman Clarence Avant. By the end of the month, Dru Hill had settled with Island Records, and issued a joint statement with the label, stating in the agreement that they would remain on the label.

Enter the Dru
Dru Hill's third Top 20 pop hit came in the form of 1998's "How Deep Is Your Love" (Pop #3), which was included on the soundtrack to the Jackie Chan and Chris Tucker film Rush Hour. The single "This Is What We Do", featuring a guest rap from Method Man , set the tone for the group's second album, Enter the Dru. The album featured several other mid-tempo tracks in the vein of "How Deep Is Your Love", as well as the R&B Top 5 single "These are the Times" (Pop #21), co-written and co-produced by Babyface, and featuring guitar work from Atlanta-based session guitarist and former Earth Wind & Fire member Dick Smith.

Enter the Dru eventually sold two million copies by 1999 and peaked at number two on the Billboard 200. That year, Dru Hill recorded a version of "Enchantment Passing Through" for the soundtrack to the Broadway musical Aida, which was also featured on Sisqó's album Unleash the Dragon.

Sisqó released his debut Unleash the Dragon LP, and had a minor hit with his first single, "Got to Get It" featuring Make It Hot. His second single, "Thong Song", became a major hit during the spring of 2000, and his third, "Incomplete", became a number-one hit during the summer.

Dru World Order
Dru World Order was released on November 26, 2002, two years after its original planned release date. Nearly all of the album's tracks were produced by Nokio, who sung lead on the tracks "She Said" and "Men Always Regret". Producers such as Bryan Michael Cox, Eric "Nealante" Phillips and Kwamé also made contributions. Most of the album's tracks featured Sisqó, Jazz, Woody, and Scola sharing the leads, including the lead single "I Should Be...". "I Should Be..." was a Top 30 pop hit and a Top 10 R&B hit.

Def Soul released a greatest hits compilation, Dru Hill: Hits, on October 11, along with a corresponding DVD collection of the group's music videos. Both collections included Sisqó's biggest solo hits, "Thong Song" and "Incomplete", alongside the Dru Hill songs.

Woody's and Scola's departure
In early 2008, the original quartet version of Dru Hill began touring alongside fellow 1990s acts Tony! Toni! Toné!, Bell Biv Devoe, and a former producer on their first album Keith Sweat. The group held a contest in their native Baltimore for a replacement for Woody, settling upon a new singer, Antwuan "Tao" Simpson. The group never said why they did not keep Scola in the group, although it was later stated by Nokio that "five people [mess] up the money".

InDRUpendence Day
InDRUpendence Day is Dru Hill's fourth album, released on July 27, 2010. It features the group's new member, Tao, who was Woody's replacement. The album has released three singles: "Love MD", "Remain Silent" and "Back to the Future". It was released under the label Kedar Entertainment.

New lineup and The Second Coming
Jazz left the group in early 2018 to work on his solo album and Tao left in early 2019 to work on a solo project because he did not like the direction Dru Hill was going.

In August 2018 a new album, The Second Coming, was announced. It was to feature two new members from the group Playa, Smoke and Black, who started performing with them after Jazz left the group. The album was to be released under Dru Hill, LLC and Empire Distribution. The first single from the album, "What You Need", was released in February 2020. Later that month, Nokio confirmed on Magic 95.9 that he has left Dru Hill to spend time with his family. A comeback of the band with the new lineup, Sisqo, Smoke, and Black, was hinted in March 2020. By 2021, Nokio, Jazz, Tao and Scola returned to the group, gearing up to celebrate their 25th anniversary, making them a seven-man group and leaving Woody as the only member no longer active in the group.

Television appearances
Dru Hill had their own television show titled Keith Sweat's Platinum House. It debuted June 28, 2010, on Centric. It focused on their fourth album, InDRUpendence Day, and depicted the progress of returning as a full group, and their work to create new music.

The original premiere on July 14, 2009, on the main BET Network was postponed, but aired later on Centric.

Members

Current members
 Sisqó – (1992–present)
 Nokio – (1992–2020; 2021–present)
 Jazz – (1993–2018; 2021–present)
 Scola – (2001–2008; 2021–present)
 Tao – (2008–2019; 2021–present)
 Smoke – (2018–present)
 Black – (2018–present)

Former members
 Woody – (1992; 1994–1999, 2002–2008)

Discography

Studio albums
 Dru Hill (1996)
 Enter the Dru (1998)
 Dru World Order (2002)
 InDRUpendence Day (2010)

Filmography

Television
 Moesha 
 The Parent 'Hood

TV specials
 Breaking Out: The Alcatraz Concert 
 24 hours with Dru Hill 
 Keith Sweat's Platinum House 
 Unsung

Tours
Headlining
 Enter the Dru Tour 
Featured act
 Budweiser Superfest 97 
 No Way Out Tour 
 Budweiser Superfest 98 
 Keep the Faith Tour 
 Luv U Better Tour 
 Game Changer Tour 
 The 20th Anniversary Tour 
 The 25th Anniversary Tour (Sisqo, Nokio, Jazz, Scola, Tao, Smoke, Black) (2022-2023)
As supporting act
 Evolution Tour (supporting Boyz II Men)

Awards and nominations
 American Music Awards

|-
| style="text-align:center;" rowspan=2| 1998
|rowspan=4| Dru Hill
| Favorite Soul/R&B Band/Duo/Group
| 
|-
| Favorite Soul/R&B New Artist
| 
|-
| style="text-align:center;" rowspan=1| 2000
| Favorite Soul/R&B Band/Duo/Group
| 
|-
| style="text-align:center;" rowspan=1| 2003
| Favorite Soul/R&B Band/Duo/Group
| 
|-

 Soul Train Music Awards

|-
| style="text-align:center;" rowspan=2| 1998
|rowspan=1| Dru Hill
| Best R&B/Soul Album – Group, Band or Duo
| 
|-
|rowspan=1| In My Bed
| Best R&B/Soul Single – Group, Band or Duo
| 
|-
| style="text-align:center;" rowspan=1| 1999
|rowspan=1| Enter the Dru
| Best R&B/Soul Album – Group, Band or Duo
| 
|-
| style="text-align:center;" rowspan=1| 2000
|rowspan=1| Beauty
| Best R&B/Soul Single – Group, Band, or Duo
| 
|-
| style="text-align:center;" rowspan=1| 2003
|rowspan=1| I Should Be...
| Best R&B/Soul Single – Group, Band or Duo
| 

Kids' Choice Awards

|-
| style="text-align:center;" rowspan=1| 1999
|rowspan=1| Dru Hill
| Favorite Group
|

Notes

References
 Furman, Leah (2001). Sisqó: The Man Behind the Thong. New York: St. Martin's Press. .
 Willman, Chris (January 26, 2001). "Here and Now: This week on the music beat". Entertainment Weekly.

External links
 

 
African-American musical groups
American contemporary R&B musical groups
Def Jam Recordings artists
Island Records artists
Musical groups from Baltimore
Musical groups established in 1992